"Crying at the Discoteque" is a song by Swedish band Alcazar from their debut studio album, Casino (2000). The track samples Sheila and B. Devotion's 1979 hit "Spacer". Alexander Bard produced the song and can be heard in the middle of this song. Released in April 2000, "Crying at the Discoteque" became Alcazar's first international hit single the following year, reaching number one in Hungary and the top 10 in Flanders, Germany, Ireland, Italy, and Switzerland.

Music video
A music video was produced to promote the single. It consists of Alcazar as a 1970s band during the process of their music video being filmed, with a theme that the band being on a deserted planet or wasteland. They are wearing outfits making them look futuristic with animal masked dancers in the background. During the filming things go wrong with the set designers getting in the way, the band disagreeing with the director, having script changes and general other mishaps.

Track listings

 Swedish CD single
 "Crying at the Discoteque" (radio edit) – 3:50
 "Crying at the Discoteque" (extended version) – 4:58
 "Crying at the Discoteque" (DeTox dub) – 6:29
 "Crying at the Discoteque" (Pinocchio Tesco Mix) – 4:47

 Swedish 12-inch single
A1. "Crying at the Discoteque" (extended version) – 4:58
A2. "Crying at the Discoteque" (Illicit remix) – 7:13
B1. "Crying at the Discoteque" (Pinocchio Tesco Mix) – 4:47
B2. "Crying at the Discoteque" (Mind Trap's disco dub) – 7:57

 European CD single
 "Crying at the Discoteque" (radio edit) – 3:50
 "Crying at the Discoteque" (extended version) – 4:58

 UK cassette single
 "Crying at the Discoteque" (radio edit) – 3:50
 "Crying at the Discoteque" (Pinocchio Tesco Mix) – 4:47

 UK CD single
 "Crying at the Discoteque" (radio edit) – 3:50
 "Crying at the Discoteque" (Illicit remix) – 7:13
 "Crying at the Discoteque" (Ivan's X Mix) – 7:18

 UK 12-inch single
A1. "Crying at the Discoteque" (extended version) – 4:58
B1. "Crying at the Discoteque" (DeTox dub) – 6:29
B2. "Crying at the Discoteque" (Illicit remix) – 7:13

 Australian CD single
 "Crying at the Discoteque" (radio edit) – 3:50
 "Crying at the Discoteque" (extended version) – 4:58
 "Crying at the Discoteque" (Illicit remix) – 7:13
 "Crying at the Discoteque" (Mind Trap's disco dub) – 7:57

Charts

Weekly charts

Year-end charts

Certifications

Release history

Sophie Ellis-Bextor version
In September 2020, British singer Sophie Ellis-Bextor released a cover version as a single to promote her greatest hits album Songs from the Kitchen Disco. The cover was described as having "distinctive vocals and infectious charisma". It reached number 35 on the Scottish Singles Chart.

Music video
The song's music video was directed by Sophie Muller and was filmed in a day in seven London music venues: Bush Hall, Apollo Theatre, St Moritz, Clapham Grand, Heaven, Omeara, and the O2. In the clip, Sophie performs the song on stage to empty rooms, raising awareness of the effect that the COVID-19 pandemic was having on the live events industry at the time.

Track listing
Digital download/streaming
"Crying at the Discotheque" – 3:51

Charts

References

2000 singles
2000 songs
2020 singles
Alcazar (band) songs
Ariola Records singles
Arista Records singles
Bertelsmann Music Group singles
Number-one singles in Hungary
Songs written by Alexander Bard
Songs written by Anders Hansson (songwriter)
Songs written by Anders Wollbeck
Songs written by Bernard Edwards
Songs written by Nile Rodgers
Sony BMG singles
Sophie Ellis-Bextor songs